Kansas City Southern (KCS) is a pure transportation holding company with railroad investments in the United States, Mexico, and Panama.

KCS's hubs include Kansas City, Missouri; Shreveport, Louisiana; New Orleans; Dallas; and Houston. Among Class I railroads, KCS has the shortest route between Kansas City, the second-largest rail hub in the country, and the Gulf of Mexico.

KCSM reaches the Gulf of Mexico ports of Tampico, Altamira, and Veracruz, and the Pacific Ocean deepwater container port of Lázaro Cárdenas. KCS obtained 100% of ownership of KCSM in 2005, making KCS the only U.S. Class I Railroad to own track in Mexico.

The company also owns half of Panama Canal Railway Company (PCRC), which operates the Panama Canal Railway, providing ocean-to-ocean transshipment service between the Atlantic and Pacific oceans. The  railroad serves as an intermodal line for world commerce and complements the Canal, the Colón Free Trade Zone, and the Pacific and Atlantic ports. As of 2009, PCRC's wholly owned subsidiary, Panarail Tourism, offered passenger service for business commuters, tourists, and private charters.

, Canadian Pacific Railway is attempting to merge Kansas City Southern's operations with its own. When approved by the US Surface Transportation Board, the combined "Canadian Pacific Kansas City Limited" will form the only railroad serving all of the countries in the North American trade zone (Canada, Mexico and the United States). On March 15, 2023, the STB approved the merger between the two companies, which may take effect on April 14, 2023.

History 

In 1887, Arthur Edward Stilwell and Edward L. Martin began construction on and incorporated the Kansas City Suburban Belt Railway in suburban Kansas City, Missouri. Beginning operations in 1890, the railroad served the Argentine District in Kansas City, Kansas; Independence, Missouri; and the riverside commercial and industrial districts of Kansas City.

While the Belt Railway was a success, Stilwell had a much bigger dream. Over the ensuing decade, the line grew through construction and acquisition of other roads, such as the Texarkana and Fort Smith Railway, to become a through route between Kansas City and Port Arthur, Texas. With the final spike being driven north of Beaumont, Texas, on September 11, 1897, the Kansas City, Pittsburg and Gulf Railroad Company (KCP&G) was completed. In 1900, KCP&G became The Kansas City Southern Railway Company (KCS). In 1939, KCS acquired the Louisiana and Arkansas Railway (L&A), providing a route extending from Dallas to New Orleans, via Shreveport, Louisiana.

In 1962, KCS reorganized as a holding company, Kansas City Southern Industries, Inc. (KCSI), as it began to diversify its interests into other industries under the CEO William Deramus III. The new KCSI focused primarily on the financial industry, along with the rail industry. In 1969, KCSI started the two largest companies that came out of the diversification: DST Systems and Janus Capital Group, which was known as Stilwell Financial at the time. DST Systems is a software development firm that specializes in information processing and management, with the goal of improving efficiency, productivity, and customer service. Janus Capital Group is a finance firm that provides growth and risk-managed investment strategies.

Expansion in the 1990s 
The core KCSI rail system changed little until the 1990s, when the purchase of MidSouth Rail extended KCSI's reach east from Shreveport into Mississippi and Alabama. Combined with existing KCSI routes, this created an east-west mainline marketed as the Meridian Speedway. Another acquisition, the Gateway Western Railway, extended KCS's reach from Kansas City to St. Louis, Missouri, and Springfield, Illinois.

The 1990s also saw KCSI expand into Mexico with the acquisition of partial interests in the Texas Mexican Railway (TM) and Grupo Transportación Ferroviaria Mexicana (TFM).  TFM was created when KCSI and Transportacion Maritima Mexicana (TMM) purchased a government concession to operate a rail system in Mexico. The concession was also bid on by many other major companies, including the United States' largest railroad, Union Pacific Railroad. KCSI and TMM bid on, and won, the concession for $1.4 billion USD, paying 49% and 51%, respectively. TMM already partially owned the Texas Mexican Railway through a previous concession from the Mexican government. TM was particularly important to KCSI because they held the link from KCSI tracks to TFM tracks via trackage rights over the Union Pacific line.

Shortly after acquiring the Mexican government's concession, KCSI entered into another joint venture to purchase a government concession.  On June 19, 1998, the government of Panama turned over control of the Panama Canal Railway to Kansas City Southern Railroad and the privately held Lanigan Holdings, LLC. This created the Panama Canal Railway Company (PCRC).

After these large capital outputs, KCSI needed new money to improve the Mexican and Panamanian concessions they had purchased, and to continue to make capital expenditures in the future. To fund these efforts, KCSI spun off all assets that were not essential to the rail businesses. Doing this essentially paid off the purchase of their two existing concessions and freed up money to improve them. The first major improvement that took place was in 2000 and 2001 when the PCRC upgraded the railway to handle large, intermodal shipping containers, along with passenger transport.

In 2002, the Kansas City Southern Industries formally changed its name to Kansas City Southern (KCS) after spinning off many subsidiary businesses that were not directly related to the railroad business (the largest of which were Janus Capital Group and DST Systems). In 2005, Kansas City Southern purchased TMM's share in TFM and TM, giving them full ownership of the companies. TFM was officially renamed Kansas City Southern de México, S.A. de C.V.  The Texas Mexican Railway retained its original name and is a subsidiary of KCS.

In June 2009, the Kansas City Southern began operating on new trackage between Victoria and Rosenberg, Texas, known as the Macaroni Line
.

Patrick J. Ottensmeyer  was named President in April 2015 and CEO in June 2016, succeeding David Starling. Ottensmeyer had served as Executive Vice President of Sales and Marketing and Chief Financial Officer. He was named Railroader of the Year by Railway Age for 2020.

In September 2020, the company rejected takeover offers from Global Infrastructure Partners that ranged up to $23 billion; the final offer valued the company at a 17% premium over its share high in February 2020 despite the COVID-19 pandemic.

Merger with Canadian Pacific Railway 
In March 2021, Calgary-based Canadian Pacific Railway offered over $25 billion to purchase KCS. The purchase would allow the Canadian company to create the first rail network connecting the United States, Mexico and Canada. However, in May 2021, Canadian National Railway announced a superior bid to CP's, which KCS management later agreed to support. In August 2021, CP announced an increased bid that, while still less than CN's bid, was claimed by CP to have a greater chance of regulatory approval. While KCS's board agreed to CN's bid, shareholder and regulatory approvals were still required; on August 31, the US Surface Transportation Board (STB) denied a voting trust between CN and KCS.

With the decision by the STB, KCS re-engaged with CP on CP's original offer. On September 15, KCS confirmed that it had terminated its agreement with CN and would support CP's revised offer. Kansas City Southern's shareholders voted to approve the merger on December 10, 2021.  The transaction closed in early 2022, following which KCS is held in a previously-approved voting trust pending approval by the STB expected to conclude in 2023; if and when fully approved, the combined company will be named Canadian Pacific Kansas City (CPKC). If approved by the STB, the combined "Canadian Pacific Kansas City Limited" will form the only railroad serving all of the countries in the North American trade zone (Canada, Mexico and the United States).

On March 15, 2023, the STB approved the merger between the two companies. The merger may take effect on April 14, 2023, with the combined railroad becoming known as Canadian Pacific Kansas City.

Subsidiaries

In addition to KCS, KCSM and PCRC, Kansas City Southern’s subsidiaries include:
 Gateway Eastern Railway Company (GWWE) is a wholly owned subsidiary of KCS.
 Meridian Speedway, LLC (MSLLC) is a majority-owned, consolidated subsidiary that owns the former KCS rail line between Meridian, Mississippi and Shreveport, Louisiana, which is a portion of the KCS rail route between Dallas and Meridian, and is known as the "Meridian Speedway." Norfolk Southern Corporation (NS), through its wholly owned subsidiary, the Alabama Great Southern Railroad, owns a minority interest in MSLLC.
 Southern Capital, Development, and Industrial Services Companies: The Southern Capital company consists of bulk storage facilities complete with ocean terminals (Pabtex) along with a tie and timber plant (Trans-Serve, Inc., also known as Superior Tie and Timber).  The Southern Development Company is a holding company that owns various properties.  The Southern Capital Corporation, LLC is a leasing company owned jointly by KCS and GATX Capital Corporation of San Francisco, California, Southern Capital Corporation has the rail assets that once belonged to Carland and KCS, as well as the loan portfolio once owned by Southern Leasing Corporation.
 The Texas Mexican Railway Company (TexMex) is wholly owned by KCS. TexMex consists of a  railway that connects Corpus Christi, Texas to Laredo, Texas. TexMex also owns  of Union Pacific trackage rights that spans from Beaumont, Texas to Robstown, Texas. With its trackage rights and physical railway, the Texas Mexican Railway connects KCSM and KCS at Laredo and Beaumont. TexMex also owns the Texas Mexican Railway International Bridge. It is the only rail bridge that connects the United States with Mexico through Laredo, and 40% of all rail traffic that travels to Mexico crosses over this bridge. Without TexMex, it would be nearly impossible for KCS and KCSM to act as a single company under Kansas City Southern.
 KCS also owns a handful of non-core businesses.  These minor subsidiaries, holding companies or minority investments (investments in which KCS has less than 50 percent ownership), have few employees and serve to support the rail operation. These include Canama Transportation, Caymex Transportation, Inc., Rosenberg Regional LLC, Joplin Union Depot, Kansas City Terminal Railway, Port Arthur Bulk Marine Terminal Co. and Veals, Inc.

Company officers 

The following is a list of the executives heading KCS since 1889.

 Edward L. Martin (1889–1897)
 Arthur Stilwell (1897–1900)
 Samuel W. "Colonel" Fordyce (1900)
 Stuart R. Knott (1900–1905)
 Job A. Edson (1905–1918)
 Leonor F. Loree (1918–1920)
 Job A. Edson (1920–1927)
 Charles E. Johnston (1928–1938)
 Harvey C. Couch (1939)
 C.P. "Pete" Couch (1939–1941)
 William N. Deramus, Jr. (1941–1961)
 William N. Deramus III (1961–1973)
 Thomas S. Carter (1973–1986)
 William N. Deramus IV (1986–1990)
 Landon H. Rowland (1990–1991)
 George W. Edwards (1991–1995)
 Michael R. Haverty (1995–2010)
 Arthur Shoener (2005-2008)
 David L. Starling (2008–2016)
 Patrick J Ottensmeyer (2015–present)

See also

Kansas City Southern de México
Kansas City Southern Railway
Kansas City Terminal Railway
List of cities served by Kansas City Southern
List of United States railroads
Panama Canal Railway

References

External links

 Kansas City Southern Corporate Website

Companies formerly listed on the New York Stock Exchange
Companies based in Kansas City, Missouri
2021 mergers and acquisitions